The men's 3 × 1000 metres relay event at the 1968 European Indoor Games was held on 10 March in Madrid.

Results

References

4 × 400 metres relay at the European Athletics Indoor Championships
Relay